VSE may refer to:

Education
 University of Economics, Prague, in Czechia
 Vancouver School of Economics, at the University of British Columbia

Science and technology
 VSE (operating system)
 Odakyu 50000 series VSE, a Japanese electric multiple unit
 Vision for Space Exploration, a space policy of the United States
 Visual Smalltalk Enterprise, a Smalltalk dialect

Stock exchanges
 Vadodara Stock Exchange, India
 Vancouver Stock Exchange, Canada
 Varaždin Stock Exchange, Croatia
 Vilnius Stock Exchange, Lithuania

Other uses 
 Viseu Airport, in Portugal
 VSE Corporation, an American business services company